Ulrike Adeberg (married Spielmann) (born 29 December 1970) is a German speed skater. She competed in the 1994 Winter Olympics.

References

External links

1970 births
Living people
Speed skaters at the 1994 Winter Olympics
German female speed skaters
Olympic speed skaters of Germany
People from Merseburg
World Allround Speed Skating Championships medalists
Sportspeople from Saxony-Anhalt